Bakhtapur union is a Union of Fatikchhari Upazila of Chittagong District, Bangladesh.

Population
At the 1991 Bangladesh census, Baktapur Union had a population of 13,915 and house units 1861.

Education
 Dr Enamul Hoque High School
 Mahater Dighi Primary
 Dairabari Primary & High School
 Goldar Bari School
 Jharnar Dighi School & Maddarasha
Bakhtapur Adarsha Kindergarten

References

Unions of Fatikchhari Upazila